Katharina Gamlemshaug Andresen (born 21 May 1995) is a Norwegian heiress, and as of 2020, the world's third-youngest billionaire (US$ 1.1 billion) as reported by Forbes.

She is the daughter of Johan H. Andresen Jr., owner of Ferd AS, who, in 2007, transferred 42.2% ownership stakes each to Katharina and her sister Alexandra. She is the great-granddaughter of Johan H. Andresen, great-great-granddaughter of Johan Henrik Andresen and Anton Klaveness, and great-great-great-granddaughter of Nicolai Andresen. Johan Henrik was the brother of Nicolay August Andresen, and the uncle of Nils August Andresen Butenschøn.

In November 2017, Andresen was fined 250,000kr (US$27,000) for drunken driving. Andresen's blood-alcohol content was three times the legal limit. Alongside the fine, the sentence included a 13-month license suspension. 

In 2019, she stated that she would be moving to London, England.

References

1995 births
Living people
Female billionaires
Norwegian billionaires
Norwegian dressage riders
Norwegian female equestrians
People from Oslo